The 55th running of the Tour of Flanders cycling race in Belgium was held on Sunday 4 April 1971, and won by Dutchman Evert Dolman. It started in Ghent and finished in Gentbrugge, over a 268-km course. It was considered one of the weakest editions of the Tour of Flanders ever, causing organizers to restyle the route in subsequent years.

Course
Eddy Merckx tried to break clear on the Kwaremont and the Muur, but was unable to make a decisive move. At 15 km from the finish, a group of 15 relative outsiders was formed. Evert Dolman, practically unknown, made an ultimate attack and finished two seconds ahead of the group. Frans Kerremans won the sprint for second place ahead of Cyrille Guimard.

Climbs
There were eight categorized climbs:

Results

References

Tour of Flanders
Tour of Flanders
Tour of Flanders
1971 Super Prestige Pernod